Drosera barbigera is a species of pygmy sundew from Western Australia. The specific epithet "barbigera" is derived from Latin and means "bearded" (barbiger = bearded).

External links 
 

barbigera
Carnivorous plants of Australia
Caryophyllales of Australia